Mach reflection is a supersonic fluid dynamics effect, named for Ernst Mach, and is a shock wave reflection pattern involving three shocks.

Introduction 

Mach reflection can exist in steady, pseudo-steady and unsteady flows. When a shock wave, which is moving with a constant velocity, propagates over a solid wedge, the flow generated by the shock impinges
on the wedge thus generating a second reflected shock, which ensures that the velocity of
the flow is parallel to the wedge surface. Viewed in the frame of the reflection point, this
flow is locally steady, and the flow is referred to as pseudosteady. When
the angle between the wedge and the primary shock is sufficiently large, a single reflected
shock is not able to turn the flow to a direction parallel to the wall and a transition to Mach
reflection occurs.

In a steady flow situation, if a wedge is placed into a steady supersonic flow in such
a way that its oblique attached shock impinges on a flat wall parallel to the free stream,
the shock turns the flow toward the wall and a reflected shock is required to turn the flow
back to a direction parallel to the wall. When the shock angle exceeds a certain value, the
deflection achievable by a single reflected shock is insufficient to turn the flow back to a
direction parallel to the wall and transition to Mach reflection is observed.

Mach reflection consists of three shocks, namely the incident shock, the reflected shock and a Mach stem, as well as a slip plane. The point where the three shocks meet is known as the 'triple point' in two dimensions, or a shock-shock in three dimensions.

Types of Mach reflection 

The only type of Mach reflection possible in steady flow is direct-Mach reflection, in which the Mach stem is convex away from the oncoming flow, and the slip plane slopes towards the reflecting surface.

By new results  there is a new configuration of shock waves - configuration with a negative angle of reflection in steady flow.

In Pseudo-steady flows, the triple point moves away from the reflecting surface and the reflection is a direct-Mach reflection. In unsteady flows, it is also possible that the triple point remains stationary relative to the reflecting surface (stationary-Mach reflection), or moves toward the reflecting surface (inverse-Mach reflection). In inverse Mach reflection, the Mach stem is convex toward the oncoming flow, and the slip plane curves away from the reflecting surface. Each one of these configurations can assume one of the following three possibilities: single-Mach reflection, transitional-Mach reflection and double-Mach reflection.

See also 
 Gas dynamics
 Shock wave
 Shock polar is a graphical tool to determine whether Mach reflection occurs.

References

External links
 The discovery of the Mach reflection effect and its demonstration in an auditorium
 Google Scholar search

Fluid dynamics